The 1937 Georgia Bulldogs football team  represented the Georgia Bulldogs of the University of Georgia during the 1937 college football season. The Bulldogs completed the season with a 6–3–2 record.

Schedule

References

Georgia
Georgia Bulldogs football seasons
Georgia Bulldogs football